By Heart is the forty-eighth studio album by American country music singer Conway Twitty. The album was released in 1984, by Warner Bros. Records.

Track listing

Personnel
Jimmy Capps - acoustic guitar
Al DeLory - string arrangements
John Hughey - steel guitar
David Hungate - bass guitar
Shane Keister - keyboards
Larry Keith - background vocals
The Nashville String Machine - strings
Donna Rhodes - background vocals
Perry Rhodes - background vocals
Mike Schrimpf - synergy on "Without You"
Buddy Spicher - fiddle
James Stroud - drums, percussion
Conway Twitty - lead vocals, background vocals
Joni Lee Twitty - background vocals
Reggie Young - electric guitar

Charts

Weekly charts

Year-end charts

References

1984 albums
Conway Twitty albums
Warner Records albums
Albums produced by Jimmy Bowen